The 2020–21 Premier League was a professional association football league season in England.

2020–21 Premier League may also refer to:

Association football
 2020–21 Armenian Premier League
 2020–21 Azerbaijan Premier League
 2020–21 Dhivehi Premier League
 2020–21 Premier League of Belize
 2020–21 Premier League of Bosnia and Herzegovina
 2020–21 Egyptian Premier League
2020–21 Ghana Premier League
 2020–21 Hong Kong Premier League
 2020–21 I-League
 2020–21 Iraqi Premier League
 2020–21 Israeli Premier League
 2020–21 Lebanese Premier League
 2020–21 Maltese Premier League
 2020–21 Russian Premier League
 2020–21 Syrian Premier League
 2020–21 Tanzanian Premier League
 2020–21 Ukrainian Premier League
 2020–21 Welsh Premier League

Basketball
 2020–21 Belarusian Premier League
 2020–21 Israeli Basketball Premier League

Cricket
 2020–21 Bangladesh Premier League
 2021 Indian Premier League